Santa Ana Fire Station Headquarters No. 1, at 1322 N. Sycamore St. in Santa Ana, California, is a fire station which was built in 1929. It was listed on the National Register of Historic Places in 1986.

It was designed by Santa Ana architect Frederick Eley.  It is a two-story Spanish Colonial Revival-style, stuccoed building.

References

External links

Fire stations on the National Register of Historic Places in California
National Register of Historic Places in Orange County, California
Mission Revival architecture in California
Buildings and structures completed in 1929